Cayo is a 2005 Puerto Rican film  directed by Vicente Juarbe and written by Ineabelle Colón and Pedro Muñiz. The film also stars Roselyn Sánchez.

Plot
The film follows the life of Iván,  a former Vietnam War veteran (who later becomes a New York City police officer) who returns to his childhood home island of Culebra in Puerto Rico, after he is diagnosed with cancer. Married to his longtime love, Julia, he tries to reconnect with his former best friend, Kike, who has estranged himself from the couple after Julia broke his heart and married Iván instead.

Cast
 Roselyn Sánchez as Young Julia
 Ivan Camilo as Kike
 Raul Carbonell, Jr. as Willie
 Kamar de los Reyes as Young Ivan
 Carlos Esteban Fonseca as Ivan
 Ineabelle Colón as Matilde
 Yamaris Latorre as Lourdes
 Idalia Pérez Garay as Julia
 Aris Mejias Agosto as Aidita

See also
 Cinema of Puerto Rico
 List of films set in Puerto Rico
 List of Puerto Rican Academy Award winners and nominees

Sources
 Todo listo para el estreno de Cayo by Miguel López Ortíz.
 Roselyn Sanchez cosecha lo sembrado by Daniela Torres-Mattus.

External links
 

2005 films
Puerto Rican films
2000s Spanish-language films
Vietnam War films